Leihaorungbam Dhanachandra Singh is an Indian footballer who plays as left back.

International
Dhanachandra made his national team debut on 11 June 2015 against Oman in a Group D game of the 2018 World Cup qualifier, playing as centre back alongside Arnab Mondal in a 1–2 loss at home in Bengaluru.

Honours

Club

Mohun Bagan AC
I-League: 2014–15 I-League Champions
I-League: 2015–16 I-League Runners up
I-League: 2016–17 I-League Runners up
Federation Cup: 2015–16 Federation Cup Champions
I-League: 2019–20 I-League Champions (Captain)

Chennaiyin FC
 Indian Super League: 2015 Champions
 Indian Super League: 2017–18 Champions

References

External links
 

1987 births
Living people
Indian footballers
I-League players
Air India FC players
Mumbai FC players
Churchill Brothers FC Goa players
United SC players
Footballers from Manipur
People from Imphal
Mohun Bagan AC players
Indian Super League players
Chennaiyin FC players
Association football fullbacks
Association football central defenders